Baduarius may refer to:

Baduarius (Scythia), 6th century Byzantine general active in Scythia Minor
Baduarius, 6th century Byzantine curopalates, son-in-law of Justin II and Sophia
Baduarius (curator), 6th century figure recorded as "curator domus rerum Areobindi"